The Latvian Academy of Sport Education is an institution of higher education specialising in sport science, located in Riga, Latvia.

Organization

Departments
The Academy has 5 theoretical and 6 practical departments:
Theoretical departments
 Department of Anatomy
 Department of Infomatics 
 Department of Sports Medecine
 Department of Theory
 Department of Management

Practical departments
 Department of Swimming
 Department of Skiing
 Department of Sport Games
 Department of Heavy Athletics
 Department of Track and Field Athletics
 Department of Gymnastics

Rectors
 Mārtiņš Krūze (1921–1922)
 Jēkabs Dille (1922–1925)
 Voldemārs Cekuls (1925–1940)
 Ivans Lazurka (1945-1946)
 Jevgeņijs Sretenskis (1946–1951)
 Nikolajs Neļga (1951–1958)
 Aleksis Ailis (1958–1960)
 Jurijs Berdičevskis (1960, 1962)
 Andrejs Eļhivs (1960–1962)
 Vladimirs Maksimovs (1962–1982)
 Ilgvars Forands (1982–1988)
Uldis Grāvītis (1988–2008)
Jānis Žīdens (2008–2019)
Juris Grants (2019-present)

Notable alumni
 Ingrīda Amantova
 Raimonds Bergmanis, former Minister of Defence of Latvia, the first flag bearer for Latvia in 56 years at 1992 Summer Olympics opening ceremony
 Deniss Čerkovskis
 Žaneta Jaunzeme-Grende, former Minister for Culture of Latvia
 Ivans Klementjevs
 Inta Kļimoviča-Drēviņa
 Rihards Kozlovskis, former Minister of the Interior of Latvia
 Armands Krauliņš
 Ivo Lakučs
 Lāsma Liepa
 Modris Liepiņš
 Staņislavs Lugailo
 Jeļena Rubļevska
 Arsens Miskarovs
 Mārtiņš Pļaviņš
 Jeļena Prokopčuka, winner of the New York City Marathon (2005, 2006)
 Andrejs Rastorgujevs
 Jānis Šmēdiņš
 Žoržs Tikmers
 Dzidra Uztupe-Karamiševa
 Edvīns Zāģeris

External links 
 Official site

References

Sport in Latvia
Sports organisations of Latvia
Education in Riga
Universities and colleges in Latvia
1921 establishments in Latvia
Educational institutions established in 1921
Sports universities and colleges